Highbush cranberry is a common name for several plants and may refer to:

Viburnum trilobum, American highbush cranberry
Viburnum opulus, European highbush cranberry 
Viburnum edule, squashberry, native to North America

Berries